Varig Flight 967 was an international cargo flight from Narita International Airport in Japan to Rio de Janeiro–Galeão International Airport in Brazil, with a stopover at Los Angeles International Airport.  On 30 January 1979, the Boeing 707-323C serving the flight disappeared while en route.  Neither the aircraft nor its six crew members have ever been found.

Background

Aircraft
The aircraft involved was a Boeing 707-323C, construction number 19235, line number 519, delivered new to American Airlines and registered N7562A on 31 August 1966, and sold to Varig and delivered (as PP-VLU) on 28 March 1974. The jet was powered by four Pratt & Whitney JT3D-3B engines.

Flight crew
The flight crew consisted of Captain Gilberto Araújo da Silva, 55, First Officer Erni Peixoto Mylius, 45, Second Officers Antonio Brasileiro da Silva Neto, 39, Evan Braga Saunders, 37, and Flight Engineers José Severino Gusmão de Araújo, 42, and Nicola Exposito, 40. 

In 1973, Captain Araújo da Silva was in charge of flight RG 820, a Boeing 707 carrying 134 people which crash-landed near Orly Airport, in Paris, with 123 fatalities. In 1979, at the time of disappearance, he had more than 23,000 hours logged.

Disappearance
On 30 January 1979, the Boeing 707-323C registered PP-VLU disappeared en route from Narita International Airport to Los Angeles International Airport.  Its ultimate destination was Rio de Janeiro–Galeão International Airport.

The cargo aircraft, operated by Varig, took off at 20:23 from Narita International Airport. Last radio contact with the flight was at 20:45. Flight crew was expected to radio at 21:23, but they did not do so. Radio contact was lost about  ENE of Tokyo.

Notably, the cargo included 53 paintings by Manabu Mabe, returning from a Tokyo exhibition, valued at US$1.24 million. Neither the wreck nor the paintings were ever found.

See also

 List of accidents and incidents involving commercial aircraft
 List of missing aircraft

Similar incidents
 1948 Airborne Transport DC-3 (DST) disappearance
 1951 Canadian Pacific Air Lines Douglas DC-4 disappearance
 1953 Skyways Avro York disappearance
 BSAA Star Ariel disappearance
 BSAA Star Tiger disappearance
 Flying Tiger Line Flight 739
 Hawaii Clipper
 Malaysia Airlines Flight 370
Flight 19

References

Accidents and incidents involving the Boeing 707
Aviation accidents and incidents in 1979
967
Missing aircraft
Aviation accidents and incidents in Japan
1979 in Japan
January 1979 events in Asia